Markus Peintner (born 17 December 1980) is an Austrian ice hockey player who participated at the 2011 IIHF World Championship as a member of the Austria men's national ice hockey team.

External links

1980 births
Austrian ice hockey forwards
Austria men's national ice hockey team coaches
Graz 99ers players
Living people
Sportspeople from Vorarlberg
VEU Feldkirch players
Vienna Capitals players
EC VSV players
People from Lustenau